The canton of Saint-Fargeau-Ponthierry is a French administrative division, located in the arrondissement of Melun, in the Seine-et-Marne département (Île-de-France région).

It consists of the following communes:
 Boissise-le-Roi
 Dammarie-les-Lys
 Nandy
 Pringy
 Saint-Fargeau-Ponthierry
 Seine-Port

See also
Cantons of the Seine-et-Marne department
Communes of the Seine-et-Marne department

References

Saint-Fargeau-Ponthierry